The Tibet Bureau in Geneva is the official representation of the 14th Dalai Lama and the Tibetan Government in Exile for Central and Eastern Europe. It was established with approval of the Swiss Federal Government in 1964.

The Bureau is responsible for preparing the visits of the Dalai Lama and officials of the government-in-exile, supporting Tibetan culture, religion and language, supporting Tibetan citizens living in Europe, and promoting the cause of Tibet internationally.

The Bureau is headed by a Representative (Ambassador), who is assisted by an Under-Secretary.

List of representatives
Phala Thupten Woenden 1964–1973
Nehnang Lopsang Choepel 1973–1976
Sangling Tsering Dorjee	1976–1985
Kelsang Gyaltsen 1 Sep 1985–Feb 1992
Gyaltsen Gyaltag Nov 1991–Sep 1995
Chungdak Koren 5 Sep 1995 – 26 Aug 2001
Chhime Rigzing 27 Aug 2001 – 15 Sep 2005
Kelsang Gyaltsen 1 Sep 2005 – 30 Mar 2008
Tseten Samdup Chhoekyapa 1 April 2008–

References

External links
Official website

Offices of Tibet
Central Tibetan Administration
Diplomatic missions in Geneva
Organisations based in Geneva
Organizations established in 1964
Switzerland–Tibet relations